Magic is a studio album by Amii Stewart released in 1992. The album which includes singles "Don't Be So Shy" and "Don't Stop" was a collaboration with Narada Michael Walden and British songwriting duo Climie Fisher.

Track listing
"Don't Be So Shy"  (Dakota, Walden, Walden)  - 4:55
"Stay With Me" (Humes)  - 5:36
"I Can't Give Up" (Booth, Romani, Stewart) -  5:19
"Now That We're Here"  (Giscombe, Glass, Taylor) - 4:46
"Fly on the Wall"  (Biddu, Stirling) - 4:30
"There Has Got to Be a Way"  (Climie, Fisher, Morgan) - 4:55
"A Better Day"  (Britti, Stewart) - 5:25
"Don't Stop" (Giscombe, Glass, Taylor) - 4:35
"Like a Stone"  (Neri, Stewart) - 4:18
"Song for Daddy"  (Puccioni, Stewart) - 4:21
"Warm Embrace"  (Nava, Stewart) - 3:57
"Le Storie Lunghe"  (Nava) - 4:01

Personnel
 Amii Stewart - Lead vocals, Backing vocals, Backing vocal arrangement
 Marco Rinalduzzi, Paolo Gianolio - Guitars
 Danilo Rea, Luca Orioli, Mario Puccioni, Vittorio Cosma - Piano
 Davide Romani - Bass, Programming, Computer, Backing vocal arrangement
 Lele Melotti - Drums
 Luca Cerosimo - Computer, Sampling, Editing
 Michael Rosen - Alto and Soprano saxophone
 Miguel Brown, Orlando Johnson, Patrick Booth, Paul Fredericks, Shirley Fredericks, William Lessenberry - Backing vocals

Production
 Amii Stewart - producer
 Davide Romani - producer
 Narada Michael Walden - producer

References

1992 albums
Amii Stewart albums
albums produced by Narada Michael Walden